Seminary Springs is an unincorporated community located in the town of Burke, Dane County, Wisconsin, United States.

Notes

Unincorporated communities in Dane County, Wisconsin
Unincorporated communities in Wisconsin